At the Club is the debut studio album by the British band Kenickie. It was released in 1997 and reached number nine on the UK Albums Chart. At the Club includes the singles "Punka", "Millionaire Sweeper", "In Your Car", "Nightlife" and "Come Out 2nite"; the lead track from the group's second EP Skillex. "How I Was Made" and an earlier stage of recording of "Acetone" also previously appeared on Skillex - the latter recording had also been used as part of an acoustic Peel Session in February 1996 and therefore appears on the band's BBC Peel Sessions CD.

The album was produced by John Cornfield, Andy Carpenter and band-member Peter Gofton (Johnny X). Receiving good reviews the album was first released by Bob Stanley and Pete Wiggs's label EMIdisc in the UK on CD, Cassette and LP on 12 May 1997. The album was released the following month in the US by Warner Bros. with an additional two tracks. The front cover photograph was taken by Warren Du Preez.

Track listing

Personnel
Track numbering relates to the track listing of the UK release.

Kenickie
Lauren Laverne - Lead Vocals, Guitar, Thigh-slaps, Keyboards, Piano, Cello, Handclaps, Tambourine
Marie du Santiago - Lead Guitar, Vocals, Thigh-slaps, Keyboards, Indian Bells, Handclaps
Emmy-Kate Montrose - Bass, Vocals, Thigh-slaps, Keyboards, Trumpet, Indian Bells, Handclaps
Johnny X - Drums, Piano, Handclaps, Percussion, Lead Guitar (9)

Other personnel
Ruth Thomas - Trumpet (5)
Andy Carpenter - Producer (2, 5, 7, 10, 13), Engineer (4, 12, 14), Additional Production (4, 14)
John Cornfield - Producer (1, 3, 6, 8, 10, 11, 13), Engineer (1, 3, 11), Mixing (6)
Peter Gofton - Producer (2, 4, 5, 10, 12, 13, 14), Assistant Producer (1, 3, 8, 11), Assistant Engineer (1, 3, 8, 11)
Darren Nash - Engineer (2, 5, 7, 11, 13)
Sean Thompson - Engineer (1 to 5, 7, 8, 11, 13, 14)
Adrian Bushby - Mixing (1 to 5, 7, 8, 11, 13, 14), Programming (7)
Pete Davies - Assistant Programming (7)
Clive Goddard - Engineer (10)
Mike "Spike" Drake - Mixing (10)
Warren Du Preez - Front Cover Photography
Andy Phillips - Photography
Martin Goodacre - Photography

B-sides
from "Punka"
 "Drag Race"
 "Walrus"
 "Cowboy"

from "Millionaire Sweeper"
 "Kamikaze Annelids"
 "Perfect Plan 9t6"
 "Girl's Best Friend"

from "In Your Car"
 "Can I Take U 2 The Cinema?"
 "I'm An Agent" (Gary Numan cover)
 "Private Buchowski"
 "Killing Fantasy"

from "Nightlife"
 "JP"
 "Kenix"
 "Skateboard Song"
 "Eat the Angel"

from "Punka" (re-release)
 "Brighter Shade of Blue"
 "Lights Out in a Provincial Town"
 "Waste You"
 "We Can Dream"
- CD1 of this issue features the original single version of "Punka", CD2 the re-recorded album version.

References

External links

At the Club at YouTube (streamed copy where licensed)

Kenickie albums
1997 debut albums